Comfort is the debut full-length studio album by English DJ Maya Jane Coles. It was released in July 2013 under I/Am/Me Records.

Track listing

References

2013 debut albums
Maya Jane Coles albums